Santa Rosa is an unincorporated community in northeast DeKalb County, in the U.S. state of Missouri.

The community sits adjacent to the DeKalb-Daviess county line on the north side of Missouri Route E. Grindstone Creek flows past one-quarter mile to the east.

History
A post office called Santa Rosa was established in 1875, and remained in operation until 1954. Besides the post office the community had a schoolhouse, the Santa Rosa School.

References

Unincorporated communities in DeKalb County, Missouri
Unincorporated communities in Missouri